The Solomon Islands women's national sevens team is Solomon Islands national representative in Rugby sevens. They participated in the 2012 Oceania Women's Sevens Championship in Fiji. At the 2019 Oceania Women's Sevens Championship in Fiji, they finished in sixth place.

Current squad
Squad to 2012 Oceania Women's Sevens Championship 
Nester Pitabelama
Suzie Seuika
Betty Kafoa
Margaret Pisu
Ethel Kere
Prudence Fula (c)
Margaret Taetonu
Hazilyn Sade
Emele Delaiverata
Priscilla Tariga
Joycelyn Taurikeni
Everlyn Asibara

Management
Anna Manuopangai - Team Manager

References

Rugby union in the Solomon Islands
Women's national rugby sevens teams
R